KWUL-FM (101.7 FM) is a radio station licensed to Elsberry, Missouri, serving a wide area of the Metro West suburbs of St. Louis, Missouri.

The station plays a format that is a mixture of Rock and Americana music dubbed "Rock 'N Americana," and has since Spring 2018. Previous to that the station had played for nearly a year a variety of Adult Alternative rock music since returning to the air after being off the air for several years after the station was repossessed from its former owner Randy Wachter into the court ordered receivership of Dennis Wallace, a Maryland based TV and Radio engineer.

The station was originally KLPW-FM licensed to Union, Missouri. It went on the air in 1966 and for its first couple of years was a classical music station broadcasting with 1,000 watts of power. In 1968, the format was changed to country music, and it would remain as such four the next 42 years. In 2008, the 101.7 FM frequency was relocated from Union, Missouri in Franklin County, over 50 miles to the Northeast to a site high atop the Mississippi River bluffs near Elsberry, Missouri, where it better serves the St. Louis Metro West area. In 2010, the station changed its call sign to KXQX, and would broadcast Alternative Rock music as "101.7 FMX" until the poor health and financial situation of Randy Wachter, who had owned the station since 2008 took it off the air in 2014. It was able to maintain its license by broadcasting once a year until the radio station was forced into receivership in 2016.

The station returned to the air in July 2017 under the receiver with the new call sign KWUL, with an Adult album alternative rock format. KWUL would later start calling itself "K-Wulf 101.7" using the positioner "Rock N Americana."

Effective May 3, 2021, KWUL and two sister stations were sold to Louis Eckelkamp's East Central Broadcasting, LLC for $2,500 and forgiveness of the outstanding debt. On March 17, 2023, the station changed its call sign to KWUL-FM.

External links

WUL-FM
Radio stations established in 1966
1966 establishments in Missouri
Americana radio stations